Decumaria barbara, commonly called climbing hydrangea or woodvamp, is a species plant in the Hydrangea family. It is native to southeastern United States, where it is widespread. Its typical natural habitat is wet bottomland forest, although it is also found in rich mesic forests in the Appalachian Mountains.

Decumaria barbara is a high-climbing woody vine. It has adventitious roots and glossy, opposite leaves. It produces small white flowers in late spring and early summer.

The only other member of this genus is Decumaria sinensis, of central China.

Gallery

References

Hydrangeaceae